Lucas Veríssimo da Silva (born 7 July 1995), known as Lucas Veríssimo, is a Brazilian professional footballer who plays as a central defender for Primeira Liga club Benfica and the Brazil national team.

Club career

Santos

Born in Jundiaí, São Paulo, Veríssimo started his career at José Bonifácio's youth academy. He subsequently moved to Linense, being promoted to the main squad in the latter part of January 2013.

Shortly after being promoted to Linense's first team, Lucas Veríssimo joined Santos. Upon joining Santos FC, he was initially assigned to their youth setup. On 26 March 2015 he renewed his link, signing until April 2017.

On 28 November 2015, profiting from Paulo Ricardo's suspension, Veríssimo was called up by manager Dorival Júnior for a Série A match against Vasco da Gama, but remained an unused substitute in the 0–1 away loss. On 30 December 2015 he was permanently promoted to the first team, due to squad shortage. He made his senior debut on 23 January of the following year, playing the full 90 minutes in a 2–2 friendly draw at Bahia.

Veríssimo made his professional debut on 30 January 2016, starting in a 1–1 Campeonato Paulista home draw against São Bernardo. On 2 March, after being a regular starter, he renewed his contract until December 2019.

After David Braz's return from injury and the signing of Luiz Felipe, Veríssimo was demoted to fourth choice at the club. He only made his Série A debut on 14 September 2016, coming on as a late substitute for Lucas Lima in a 1–0 away win against Botafogo.

Veríssimo made his Copa Libertadores debut on 16 March 2017, starting in a 2–0 home win against The Strongest. He scored his first professional goal on 4 May, netting the winner in a 3–2 success over Independiente Santa Fe at the Pacaembu Stadium for the same competition.

On 18 July 2017, after becoming a regular starter as both starters Gustavo Henrique and Luiz Felipe were injured, Veríssimo renewed his contract until June 2022. He played his 100th match for the club the following 13 May, starting in a 3–1 home defeat of Paraná.

On 8 June 2020, Veríssimo further extended his contract with Santos until December 2024. On 9 November, he and two other teammates tested positive for COVID-19.

Benfica
On 4 January 2021, Veríssimo agreed to a move to Primeira Liga side S.L. Benfica, for a fee of €6.5 million; he remained at Santos until the end of the club's participation in the 2020 Copa Libertadores. Santos officially announced the move eleven days later. On 18 February 2021, Veríssimo made his debut in a 1–1 draw against Arsenal in the UEFA Europa League.

International career
He made his debut for Brazil national football team on 9 September 2021 in a World Cup qualifier against Peru.

Career statistics

Club

International

Honours

Club
Santos
Campeonato Paulista: 2016

Individual
Bola de Prata: 2019
Copa Libertadores Best Eleven: 2020
Primeira Liga Player of the Month: August 2021
Primeira Liga Defender of the Month: August 2021
Samba D'or (3rd Place): 2021

References

External links

Profile at the S.L. Benfica website

1995 births
Living people
People from Jundiaí
Brazilian footballers
Brazil international footballers
Association football defenders
Campeonato Brasileiro Série A players
Primeira Liga players
Santos FC players
S.L. Benfica footballers
Brazilian expatriate footballers
Brazilian expatriate sportspeople in Portugal
Expatriate footballers in Portugal
Footballers from São Paulo (state)